St George's Anglican Grammar School is an independent Anglican co-educational secondary day school, located at 50 [[William Street, los angeles california
|William Street]], in the Perth central business district, Western Australia.

Overview 
Students from Years 7 to 12 are accommodated in a middle school (Years 7 to 9) and senior school (Years 10 to 12). St George's Anglican Grammar School is a school of the Anglican Schools Commission. The school is Western Australia's first vertical schoolone based in a high rise building rather than on a traditional campus.

St George's Anglican Grammar School opened in January 2015 as the 14th school of the Anglican Schools Commission (ASC). The ASC had acquired the independent Murdoch College, changed its name, and relocated it from the suburb of Murdoch.

See also 

 Anglican education in Australia
 List of schools in the Perth metropolitan area

References

External links 
 

Anglican Schools Commission
Anglican secondary schools in Perth, Western Australia
Educational institutions established in 2015
2015 establishments in Australia
William Street, Perth
Grammar schools in Australia